The men's 5000 metres event at the 1990 Commonwealth Games was held on 29 January and 1 February at the Mount Smart Stadium in Auckland.

Medalists

Results

Heats
Qualification: First 6 of each heat (Q) and the next 3 fastest (q) qualified for the final.

Final

References

5000
1990